Brachyiulus apfelbecki is a species of millipede in the family Julidae. It is endemic to Bulgaria.

References

Animals described in 1898
Julida
Millipedes of Europe